Roger Tuohy (born 1945 in Cork, Ireland) is an Irish former sportsman. He played hurling with his local club Na Piarsaigh and was a member of the Cork senior inter-county team in the 1960s. Tuohy won an All-Ireland runners-up medal, one Munster title and a National Hurling League title with Cork in 1969.

References

1945 births
Living people
Na Piarsaigh hurlers
Cork inter-county hurlers